The following is an alphabetical list of members of the United States House of Representatives from the state of Arizona. For chronological tables of members of both houses of the United States Congress from the state (through the present day), see United States congressional delegations from Arizona. The list of names should be complete (as of January 3, 2015), but other data may be incomplete. It includes members who have represented both the state and the territory, both past and present. Statehood was granted in 1912.

Current members 
Updated January 2023. 

 - David Schweikert (R) (since 2011)
 - Eli Crane (R) (since 2023)
 - Ruben Gallego (D) (since 2015)
 - Greg Stanton (D) (since 2019)
 - Andy Biggs (R) (since 2017) 
 - Juan Ciscomani (R) (since 2023) 
 - Raúl Grijalva (D) (since 2003)
 - Debbie Lesko (R) (since 2018)
 - Paul Gosar (R) (since 2011)

List of members and delegates

See also

 List of United States senators from Arizona
 United States congressional delegations from Arizona
 Arizona's congressional districts

References 

 House of Representatives List of Members

External links 
 
 
 
 
 
 
 
 
 

Arizona
Representatives